Through and post-Karabakh war period showed the importance of taking actions to improve the field of military for Azerbaijan. The principal target of the late government under Heydar Aliyev was to establish and strengthen the military infrastructure.

History 

Azerbaijan gained independence in 1991, when it was already in the state of war with Armenia. The first national military of independent Azerbaijan including an army, navy, and air force was formed in the same year.

The Ministry of Defense of Azerbaijan was established on September 5, 1991. In this year the system of the army structure and first brigades were created, and forming process of national staff for the military forces has been started. During this period the military forces were a leading power structure in Azerbaijan. The first steps in modernizing the armed forces were made in Azerbaijan, with improvements in weapons and techniques, and the upgrading of the army's armored cars. Azerbaijan began choosing strategic allies and establishing priorities for national security.

In July 1992, Azerbaijan approved the Treaty on Conventional Armed Forces in Europe by which limits on conventional military equipment were created.

After being elected the President of Azerbaijan in 1993, the government of Heydar Aliyev started to create a single army. In November 1993, Azerbaijani parliament passed the Law on Defense. After signing ceasefire with Armenia in 1994, the country gained opportunities to conduct reforms in the Armed Forces. Constructive work and structural reforms carried out in the Armed Forces led to the planning of battle-related objectives under centralized management, management of the military divisions according to the requirements of proper military science, and improvement of the personnel.

Reforms 
After Individual Partnership Action Plan (IPAP) was signed between Azerbaijan and NATO in May 2005, Azerbaijani society's objectives concerning defense and security took on specific outlines. Within the framework of IPAP, Azerbaijan undertook numerous obligations.

Military budget of the country increased from around $2.46 billion in 2009 to $4.2 billion in 2015. The total armed forces number 56,840 men in the land forces, 7,900 men in the air force, and 2,200 men in the navy. 19,500 personnel serve in the National Guard, State Border Service, and Internal Troops. In addition, there are 300,000 former service personnel who have had military service in the last 15 years. The military hardware of Azerbaijan consists of more than 300 main battle tanks, 595 armored combat vehicles and 270 artillery systems Air forces has 106 aircraft and 35 helicopters.

Military industry 

After long years of buying all military facilities from other countries, in early 2000s, Azerbaijan decided to produce its own military equipment and machines. For this purpose, the Ministry of Defense Industry of Azerbaijan was founded on December 16, 2005 by presidential decree.

Around 130 defense goods produced in Azerbaijan, in particular, Gurza patrol vehicles, 7.62 х 54 millimeter Gurza and Shimshek-10 machine guns, 7.62 х 51 millimeter Yalguzag, Istiglal-1T and Mubariz sniper rifles, 7.62 х 54 millimeter attack machine guns of HP-7.62 type. The produced weaponry meets NATO standards.

Azerbaijan cooperates with Israeli defense firms and two Turkish companies on the production of an armored vehicle based on the Russian T-55 tank's chassis. Azerbaijan also manufactures Israeli-designed spy planes including the licensed pilotless spy plane the Orbiter-2M and the Aerostar. Both are manufactured at the Azad Systems Company plant near Baku.

Military academies 

The first stage of education is implemented in the Jamshid Nakhchivanski Military Lyceum and the Heydar Aliyev Military Lyceum. Military personnel of bachelor and master levels are prepared in high military education institutions such as the War College of the Armed Forces, the Training and Education Center of the Armed Forces, and the Azerbaijan Higher Military Academy. Other institutions include the Secondary Military Medical School of Azerbaijan and the Military Medical Faculty of Azerbaijan Medical University.

Cooperation with international organizations

Cooperation with NATO 

Azerbaijan has joined to the NATO military training and education programs since 1994. NATO's military education system standards began to be applied in the Azerbaijan Higher Military Academy since 1997, in the War College of the Armed Forces since 2000, and in the Education and Training Center of the Armed Forces since 2001. Within the framework of Individual Partnership Program (IPP) special forces are being prepared to participate in international peacekeeping and humanitarian operations. The program implementation fields include defense policy and strategy, language training; military exercises and related training; military education, etc.

Under the cooperation with NATO, a Simulation and Modeling Center was established within the War College. Operation plans, documentation, maps, and terminology used in command post and field exercises are being applied according to NATO standards. The staff structure of all types of troops in the armed forces has been brought into line in accordance with NATO standards.

Azerbaijan joined NATO's Operational Capability Concept Evaluation & Feedback program in March 2004.  It allowed to directly participate in NATO-led operations. In 1997 a peacekeeping platoon, in 2001 a peacekeeping battalion were established in the country.  NATO provided support for the process of preparing key national strategic documents, such as the National Security Concept (NSC), Military Doctrine (MD), and Strategic Defense Review (SDR). National Security Concept (NSC) was confirmed by the President of Azerbaijan on 23 May 2007. The Military Doctrine was received by the Parliament of Azerbaijan in June 2010.

Under cooperation between Azerbaijani defense structures and NATO, Azerbaijan achieved close cooperation with Euro-Atlantic security institutions, contributed to international peace and security by participating in peace support operations, increased level of operational interoperability within the NATO Operational Capability Concept Evaluation and Feedback program, applied NATO standards in the Azerbaijani military, enhanced Azerbaijan's military education and training system, developed strategic conceptual documents, training professional personnel in fields relevant to cooperation, improved operational capability.

Cooperation with ICRC 

The International Committee of the Red Cross started to operate in Azerbaijan in 1992 due to the conflict over Nagorno-Karabakh with Armenia. The main focus is directed to issues of missing persons and detainees held for conflict-oriented or security reasons. The ICRC works to protect and help population living close to the Line of Contact and the international border with Armenia.

In February 2017, the body of Azerbaijani soldier was returned from Armenia to Azerbaijan via a transfer organized by the ICRC. And during April war in 2016, the organization assisted the parties to search for and retrieve the bodies of those killed in fight.

Peacekeeping forces of Azerbaijan 

Besides protecting its borders, Azerbaijan formed its peacekeeping troops in 1997 and joined operations mainly carried out by NATO's International Security Assistance Force (ISAF) in Afghanistan. Associated forces include the Azerbaijani National Guard, the Internal Troops of Azerbaijan, and the State Border Service, which can be involved in state defense under certain circumstances. Azerbaijan is one of those countries whose peacekeeping forces serves together in a USA Marine battalion.

In Iraq, one company of Azerbaijani peacekeepers troops is in charge for guard duty in the area of Hadithah Dam which is one of critical electricity sources of the country.

Azerbaijan supported Afghanistan not only by peacekeeping contingent, but in the medical sphere and in clearing land mines. It provided opportunities for members of the Afghan military to study and train in Azerbaijan's military schools. The Azerbaijani parliament passed a decision in October 2009 to double the number of peacekeepers in Afghanistan to 90. The Azerbaijani servicemen are serving under the Turkish contingent in ISAF. Detachment personnel is protecting the TV tower in Kabul and an ISAF munitions storage as well as carrying out patrol service.
The Azerbaijani peacekeeping platoon participated in peacekeeping and peace support operations in Kosovo from September 1999 until 2008. Peacekeeping contingent from the Azerbaijan as part of the International Coalition Forces served in Iraq from August 2003 until 2008.

See also 
 Azerbaijani Armed Forces
2008 Russian military reform
2015 People's Republic of China military reform
Ottoman military reforms

External links 
 https://www.files.ethz.ch/isn/94197/b50_azerbaijan_defence_sector.pdf
 
 https://en.trend.az/azerbaijan/politics/1178693.html
 https://books.google.com/books?id=bNsEBwAAQBAJ&pg=PA313&lpg=PA313&dq=military+reforms+in+azerbaijan&source=bl&ots=_A5-XmM0MK&sig=s-gXZD6DbLQpRMB5QHTr_lbY85A&hl=en&sa=X&ved=0ahUKEwiwwv7MjLPVAhXEiRoKHVxwAXc4ChDoAQhJMAk#v=onepage&q=military%20reforms%20in%20azerbaijan&f=false
 https://www.azernews.az/nation/98487.html
 Reuters
 https://www.azernews.az/nation/55869.html

References 

Military of Azerbaijan
Political history of Azerbaijan